Schaalby is a municipality in the district of Schleswig-Flensburg, in Schleswig-Holstein, Germany. The municipality consists of the villages Füsing, Klensby, Moldenit and Schaalby.

References

Municipalities in Schleswig-Holstein
Schleswig-Flensburg